The 12th constituency of Bouches-du-Rhône is a French legislative constituency in Bouches-du-Rhône.

Deputies

Elections

2022

 
 
 
 
 
 
|-
| colspan="8" bgcolor="#E9E9E9"|
|-

2017

2012

|- style="background-color:#E9E9E9;text-align:center;"
! colspan="2" rowspan="2" style="text-align:left;" | Candidate
! rowspan="2" colspan="2" style="text-align:left;" | Party
! colspan="2" | 1st round
! colspan="2" | 2nd round
|- style="background-color:#E9E9E9;text-align:center;"
! width="75" | Votes
! width="30" | %
! width="75" | Votes
! width="30" | %
|-
| style="background-color:" |
| style="text-align:left;" | Vincent Burroni
| style="text-align:left;" | Socialist Party
| PS
| 
| 27.36%
| 
| 37.34%
|-
| style="background-color:" |
| style="text-align:left;" | Éric Diard
| style="text-align:left;" | Union for a Popular Movement
| UMP
| 
| 28.11%
| 
| 36.60%
|-
| style="background-color:" |
| style="text-align:left;" | Paul Cupolati
| style="text-align:left;" | Front National
| FN
| 
| 26.68%
| 
| 26.06%
|-
| style="background-color:" |
| style="text-align:left;" | Jean-Claude Labranche
| style="text-align:left;" | Left Front
| FG
| 
| 7.10%
| colspan="2" style="text-align:left;" |
|-
| style="background-color:" |
| style="text-align:left;" | Patrick Viloria
| style="text-align:left;" | Miscellaneous Right
| DVD
| 
| 4.65%
| colspan="2" style="text-align:left;" |
|-
| style="background-color:" |
| style="text-align:left;" | Pierre Souvent
| style="text-align:left;" | Europe Ecology – The Greens
| EELV
| 
| 2.60%
| colspan="2" style="text-align:left;" |
|-
| style="background-color:" |
| style="text-align:left;" | Alde Vinci
| style="text-align:left;" | Far Right
| EXD
| 
| 0.92%
| colspan="2" style="text-align:left;" |
|-
| style="background-color:" |
| style="text-align:left;" | Jérôme Ravenet
| style="text-align:left;" | Ecologist
| ECO
| 
| 0.88%
| colspan="2" style="text-align:left;" |
|-
| style="background-color:" |
| style="text-align:left;" | Corinne Avedissian
| style="text-align:left;" | Ecologist
| ECO
| 
| 0.66%
| colspan="2" style="text-align:left;" |
|-
| style="background-color:" |
| style="text-align:left;" | André Boye
| style="text-align:left;" | Miscellaneous Right
| DVD
| 
| 0.48%
| colspan="2" style="text-align:left;" |
|-
| style="background-color:" |
| style="text-align:left;" | François Roche
| style="text-align:left;" | Far Left
| EXG
| 
| 0.38%
| colspan="2" style="text-align:left;" |
|-
| style="background-color:" |
| style="text-align:left;" | Faouzi Djedou-Benabid
| style="text-align:left;" | Other
| AUT
| 
| 0.17%
| colspan="2" style="text-align:left;" |
|-
| style="background-color:" |
| style="text-align:left;" | Benjamin Durand
| style="text-align:left;" | Miscellaneous Left
| DVG
| 
| 0.03%
| colspan="2" style="text-align:left;" |
|-
| colspan="8" style="background-color:#E9E9E9;"|
|- style="font-weight:bold"
| colspan="4" style="text-align:left;" | Total
| 
| 100%
| 
| 100%
|-
| colspan="8" style="background-color:#E9E9E9;"|
|-
| colspan="4" style="text-align:left;" | Registered voters
| 
| style="background-color:#E9E9E9;"|
| 
| style="background-color:#E9E9E9;"|
|-
| colspan="4" style="text-align:left;" | Blank/Void ballots
| 
| 1.33%
| 
| 1.52%
|-
| colspan="4" style="text-align:left;" | Turnout
| 
| 56.59%
| 
| 57.30%
|-
| colspan="4" style="text-align:left;" | Abstentions
| 
| 43.41%
| 
| 42.70%
|-
| colspan="8" style="background-color:#E9E9E9;"|
|- style="font-weight:bold"
| colspan="6" style="text-align:left;" | Result
| colspan="2" style="background-color:" | PS GAIN FROM UMP
|}

2007

2002

 
 
 
 
|-
| colspan="8" bgcolor="#E9E9E9"|
|-

1997

 
 
 
 
 
|-
| colspan="8" bgcolor="#E9E9E9"|
|-

References

12